The Nest of the Turtledove is a 2016 Ukrainian drama film directed by Taras Tkachenko. It was named as one of three films shortlisted as the Ukrainian submission for the Academy Award for Best Foreign Language Film, but it was not selected.

Cast
 Rimma Zyubina as Daryna
 Vitaliy Linetskiy as Dmytro
 Mauro Cipriani as Alessandro
 Lina Bernardi as Vittoria

Accolades

References

External links
 

2016 films
2016 drama films
Ukrainian drama films
Ukrainian-language films